Frank Burt may refer to:
 Frank Burt (baseball)
 Frank Burt (screenwriter)